Australian English (AusE, AusEng, AuE, AuEng, en-AU) is the set of varieties of the English language native to Australia. It is the country's common language and de facto national language; while Australia has no official language, English is the first language of the majority of the population, and has been entrenched as the de facto national language since European settlement, being the only language spoken in the home for 72% of Australians. It is also the main language used in compulsory education, as well as federal, state and territorial legislatures and courts.

Australian English began to diverge from British and Irish English after the First Fleet established the Colony of New South Wales in 1788. Australian English arose from a dialectal melting pot created by the intermingling of early settlers who were from a variety of dialectal regions of Great Britain and Ireland, though its most significant influences were the dialects of Southeast England. By the 1820s, the native-born colonists' speech was recognisably distinct from speakers in Britain and Ireland.

Australian English differs from other varieties in its phonology, pronunciation, lexicon, idiom, grammar and spelling. Australian English is relatively consistent across the continent, although it encompasses numerous regional and sociocultural varieties. "General Australian" describes the de facto standard dialect, which is perceived to be free of pronounced regional or sociocultural markers and is often used in the media.

History
The earliest Australian English was spoken by the first generation of native-born colonists in the Colony of New South Wales from the end of the 18th century. These native-born children were exposed to a wide range of dialects from across the British Isles. Similar to early American English, the process of dialect levelling and koineisation which ensued produced a relatively homogeneous new variety of English which was easily understood by all. Peter Miller Cunningham's 1827 book Two Years in New South Wales described the distinctive accent and vocabulary that had developed among the native-born colonists.

The dialects of South East England, including most notably the traditional Cockney dialect of London, were particularly influential on the development of the new variety and constituted "the major input of the various sounds that went into constructing" Australian English. All the other regions of England were represented among the early colonists. A large proportion of early convicts and colonists were from Ireland, and spoke Irish as a sole or first language. They were joined by other non-native speakers of English from Scotland and Wales.

The first of the Australian gold rushes in the 1850s began a large wave of immigration, during which about two percent of the population of the United Kingdom emigrated to the colonies of New South Wales and Victoria. The Gold Rushes brought immigrants and linguistic influences from many parts of the world. An example was the introduction of vocabulary from American English, including some terms later considered to be typically Australian, such as bushwhacker and squatter. This American influence was continued with the popularity of American films from the early 20th century and the influx of American military personnel during World War II; seen in the enduring persistence of such universally-accepted terms as okay and guys.

The publication of Edward Ellis Morris's Austral English: A Dictionary Of Australasian Words, Phrases And Usages in 1898, which extensively catalogued Australian English vocabulary, started a wave of academic interest and codification during the 20th century which resulted in Australian English becoming established as an endonormative variety with its own internal norms and standards. This culminated in publications such as the 1981 first edition of the Macquarie Dictionary, a major English language dictionary based on Australian usage, and the 1988 first edition of The Australian National Dictionary, a historical dictionary documenting the history of Australian English vocabulary and idiom.

Phonology and pronunciation

The most obvious way in which Australian English is distinctive from other varieties of English is through its unique pronunciation. It shares most similarity with New Zealand English. Like most dialects of English, it is distinguished primarily by the phonetic quality of its vowels.

Vowels

The vowels of Australian English can be divided according to length. The long vowels, which include monophthongs and diphthongs, mostly correspond to the tense vowels used in analyses of Received Pronunciation (RP) as well as its centring diphthongs. The short vowels, consisting only of monophthongs, correspond to the RP lax vowels.

There exist pairs of long and short vowels with overlapping vowel quality giving Australian English phonemic length distinction, which is also present in some regional south-eastern dialects of the UK and eastern seaboard dialects in the US. An example of this feature is the distinction between ferry  and fairy .

As with New Zealand English and General American English, the weak-vowel merger is complete in Australian English: unstressed  is merged into  (schwa), unless it is followed by a velar consonant. Examples of this feature are the following pairings, which are pronounced identically in Australian English: Rosa's and roses, as well as Lennon and Lenin. Other examples are the following pairs, which rhyme in Australian English: abbott with rabbit, and dig it with bigot.

Most varieties of Australian English exhibit only a partial trap-bath split. The words bath, grass and can't are always pronounced with the "long"  of father. Throughout the majority of the country, the "flat"  of man is the dominant pronunciation for the a vowel in the following words: dance, advance, plant, example and answer. The exception is the state of South Australia, where a more advanced trap-bath split has taken place, and where the dominant pronunciation of all the preceding words incorporates the "long"  of father.

Consonants
There is little variation in the sets of consonants used in different English dialects but there are variations in how these consonants are used. Australian English is no exception.

Australian English is uniformly non-rhotic; that is, the  sound does not appear at the end of a syllable or immediately before a consonant. As with many non-rhotic dialects, linking  can occur when a word that has a final  in the spelling comes before another word that starts with a vowel. An intrusive  may similarly be inserted before a vowel in words that do not have  in the spelling in certain environments, namely after the long vowel  and after word final . This can be heard in "law-r-and order," where an intrusive R is voiced between the AW and the A.

Examples of this feature are that the following pairs are pronounced similarly or identically: latter and ladder, as well as rated and raided.

In common with most varieties of Scottish English and American English, the phoneme  is pronounced as a "dark" (velarised) l in almost all positions, unlike other dialects such as Received Pronunciation and Hiberno (Irish) English, where a light l (i.e. a non-velarised l) is used in many positions.

The wine–whine merger is complete in Australian English.

Pronunciation
Differences in stress, weak forms and standard pronunciation of isolated words occur between Australian English and other forms of English, which while noticeable do not impair intelligibility.

The affixes -ary, -ery, -ory, -bury, -berry and -mony (seen in words such as necessary, mulberry and matrimony) can be pronounced either with a full vowel or a schwa . Although some words like necessary are almost universally pronounced with the full vowel, older generations of Australians are relatively likely to pronounce these affixes with a schwa while younger generations are relatively likely to use a full vowel, which is similar to the situation in British English.

Words ending in unstressed -ile derived from Latin adjectives ending in -ilis are pronounced with a full vowel, so that fertile  sounds like fur tile rather than rhyming with turtle .

In addition, miscellaneous pronunciation differences exist when compared with other varieties of English in relation to various isolated words, with some of those pronunciations being unique to Australian English. For example:
 Urinal is stressed on the first syllable and with the schwa for I: ;
 Harass and harassment are pronounced with the stress on the second, rather than the first syllable;
 Tomato, vase and data are pronounced with  instead of : , with  being uncommon but acceptable;
 Conversely, precedence, precedent and derivatives are mainly pronounced with the  vowel in the stressed syllable, rather than : ;
 Conversely, cache is usually pronounced , rather than the conventional ;
 The E in congress and progress is not reduced: ;
 Conversely, the unstressed O in silicon, phenomenon and python stands for a schwa: ;
 In Amazon, Lebanon and marathon, however, the unstressed O stands for the  vowel, somewhat as with American English: ;
 The colour name maroon is pronounced with the  vowel: .

Variation

Relative to many other national dialect groupings, Australian English is relatively homogeneous across the country. Some relatively minor regional differences in pronunciation exist. A limited range of word choices is strongly regional in nature. Consequently, the geographical background of individuals may be inferred if they use words that are peculiar to particular Australian states or territories and, in some cases, even smaller regions. In addition, some Australians speak creole languages derived from Australian English, such as Australian Kriol, Torres Strait Creole and Norfuk.

Academic research has also identified notable sociocultural variation within Australian English, which is mostly evident in phonology.

Regional variation
Although Australian English is relatively homogeneous, there are some regional variations. The dialects of English spoken in the various states and territories of Australia differ slightly in vocabulary and phonology.

Most regional differences are in word usage. Swimming clothes are known as cossies  or swimmers in New South Wales, togs in Queensland, and bathers in Victoria, Tasmania, Western Australia and South Australia. What Queensland calls a stroller is usually called a pram in Victoria, Western Australia, South Australia, New South Wales, and Tasmania.

Preference for some synonymous words also differ between states. Garbage (i.e., garbage bin, garbage truck) dominates over rubbish in New South Wales and Queensland, while rubbish is more popular in Victoria, Tasmania, Western Australia and South Australia.

Additionally, the word footy generally refers to the most popular football code in an area; that is, rugby league or rugby union depending on the local area, in most of New South Wales and Queensland, and Australian rules football elsewhere. In some pockets of Melbourne & Western Sydney it will refer to Association football. Beer glasses are also named differently in different states. Distinctive grammatical patterns exist such as the use of the interrogative eh (also spelled ay or aye), which is particularly associated with Queensland. Secret Santa and Kris Kringle are used in all states, with the former being more common in Queensland.

South Australia
The most pronounced variation in phonology is between South Australia and the other states and territories. The trap–bath split is more complete in South Australia, in contrast to the other states. L-vocalisation is also more common in South Australia than other states.

Centring diphthongs
In Western Australian and Queensland English, the vowels in near and square are typically realised as centring diphthongs, whereas in the other states they may also be realised as monophthongs: .

Salary–celery merger
A feature common in Victorian English is salary–celery merger, whereby a Victorian pronunciation of Ellen may sound like Alan and Victoria's capital city Melbourne may sound like Malbourne to speakers from other states. There is also regional variation in  before  (as in school and pool).

Full-fool allophones
As a result, the pairs full/fool and pull/pool differ phonetically only in vowel length for those speakers.

Sociocultural variation
The General Australian accent serves as the standard variety of English across the country. According to linguists, it emerged during the 19th century. General Australian is the dominant variety across the continent, and is particularly so in urban areas. The increasing dominance of General Australian reflects its prominence on radio and television since the latter half of the 20th century.

Recent generations have seen a comparatively smaller proportion of the population speaking with the Broad sociocultural variant, which differs from General Australian in its phonology. The Broad variant is found across the continent and is relatively more prominent in rural and outer-suburban areas.

A largely historical Cultivated sociocultural variant, which adopted features of British Received Pronunciation and which was commonplace in official media during the early 20th century, had become largely extinct by the onset of the 21st century.

Australian Aboriginal English is made up of a range of forms which developed differently in different parts of Australia, and are said to vary along a continuum, from forms close to Standard Australian English to more non-standard forms. There are distinctive features of accent, grammar, words and meanings, as well as language use.

Academics have noted the emergence of numerous ethnocultural dialects of Australian English that are spoken by people from some minority non-English speaking backgrounds. These ethnocultural varieties contain features of General Australian English as adopted by the children of immigrants blended with some non-English language features, such as Afro-Asiatic languages and languages of Asia. Samoan English is also influencing Australian English.

A high rising terminal in Australian English was noted and studied earlier than in other varieties of English. The feature is sometimes called Australian questioning intonation. Research published in 1986, regarding vernacular speech in Sydney, suggested that high rising terminal was initially spread by young people in the 1960s. It found that the high rising terminal was used more than twice as often by young people than older people, and is more common among women than men. In the United Kingdom, it has occasionally been considered one of the variety's stereotypical features, and its spread there is attributed to the popularity of Australian soap operas.

Vocabulary

Intrinsic traits

Australian English has many words and idioms which are unique to the dialect and have been written on extensively.

Internationally well-known examples of Australian terminology include outback, meaning a remote, sparsely populated area, the bush, meaning either a native forest or a country area in general, and g'day, a greeting. Dinkum, or fair dinkum means "true" or "is that true?", among other things, depending on context and inflection. The derivative dinky-di means "true" or devoted: a "dinky-di Aussie" is a "true Australian".

Australian poetry, such as "The Man from Snowy River", as well as folk songs such as "Waltzing Matilda", contain many historical Australian words and phrases that are understood by Australians even though some are not in common usage today.

Australian English, in common with British English, uses the word mate to mean friend, as well as the word bloody as a mild expletive or intensifier. Bloody is taken to be milder in Australia than it is in the UK, where the word is considered profanity.

Several words used by Australians were at one time used in the United Kingdom but have since fallen out of usage or changed in meaning there. For example, creek in Australia, as in North America, means a stream or small river, whereas in the UK it is typically a watercourse in a marshy area; paddock in Australia means field, whereas in the UK it means a small enclosure for livestock; bush or scrub in Australia, as in North America, means a wooded area, whereas in England they are commonly used only in proper names (such as Shepherd's Bush and Wormwood Scrubs).

Some elements of Aboriginal languages have been adopted by Australian English—mainly as names for places, flora and fauna (for example dingo) and local culture. Many such are localised, and do not form part of general Australian use, while others, such as kangaroo, boomerang, budgerigar, wallaby and so on have become international. Other examples are cooee and hard yakka. The former is used as a high-pitched call, for attracting attention, (pronounced ) which travels long distances. Cooee is also a notional distance: "if he's within cooee, we'll spot him". Hard yakka means "hard work" and is derived from yakka, from the Jagera/Yagara language once spoken in the Brisbane region. Also of Aboriginal origin is the word bung, from the Sydney pidgin English (and ultimately from the Sydney Aboriginal language), meaning "dead", with some extension to "broken" or "useless". Many towns or suburbs of Australia have also been influenced or named after Aboriginal words. The best-known example is the capital, Canberra, named after a local Ngunnawal language word meaning "meeting place".

Litotes, such as "not bad", "not much" and "you're not wrong", are also used. Diminutives and hypocorisms are common and are often used to indicate familiarity. Some common examples are arvo (afternoon), barbie (barbecue), smoko (cigarette break), Aussie (Australian) and Straya (Australia). This may also be done with people's names to create nicknames (other English speaking countries create similar diminutives). For example, "Gazza" from Gary, or "Smitty" from John Smith.

In informal speech, incomplete comparisons are sometimes used, such as "sweet as" (as in "That car is sweet as."). "Full", "fully" or "heaps" may precede a word to act as an intensifier (as in "The waves at the beach were heaps good."). This was more common in regional Australia and South Australia but has been in common usage in urban Australia for decades. The suffix "-ly" is sometimes omitted in broader Australian English. For instance, "really good" can become "real good".

Australia's switch to the metric system in the 1970s changed most of the country's vocabulary of measurement from imperial to metric measures. Since the switch to metric, heights of individuals are listed in centimetres on official documents and distances by road on signs are listed in terms of kilometres and metres.

Comparison with other varieties

Where British and American English vocabulary differs, sometimes Australian English shares a usage with one of those varieties, as with petrol (AmE: gasoline) and mobile phone (AmE: cellular phone) which are shared with British English, or truck (BrE: lorry) and eggplant (BrE: aubergine) which are shared with American English.

In other circumstances, Australian English sometimes favours a usage which is different from both British and American English as with:

Differences exist between Australian English and other varieties of English, where different terms can be used for the same subject or the same term can be ascribed different meanings. Non-exhaustive examples of terminology associated with food, transport and clothing is used below to demonstrate the variations which exist between Australian English and other varieties:

Food – capsicum (BrE: (red/green) pepper; AmE: bell pepper); (potato) chips (refers both to BrE crisps and AmE French fries); chook (sanga) (BrE and AmE: chicken (sandwich)); coriander (shared with BrE. AmE: cilantro); entree (refers to AmE appetizer whereas AmE entree is referred to in AusE as main course); eggplant (shared with AmE. BrE: aubergine); fairy floss (BrE: candy floss; AmE: cotton candy); ice block or icy pole (BrE: ice lolly; AmE: popsicle); jelly (refers to AmE Jell-o whereas AmE jelly refers to AusE jam); lollies (BrE: sweets; AmE: candy); marinara (sauce) (refers to a tomato-based sauce in AmE and BrE but a seafood sauce in AusE); mince or minced meat (shared with BrE. AmE: ground meat); prawn (which in BrE refers to large crustaceans only, with small crustaceans referred to as shrimp. AmE universally: shrimp); snow pea (shared with AmE. BrE mangetout); pumpkin (AmE: squash, except for the large orange variety - AusE squash refers only to a small number of uncommon species; BrE: marrow); tomato sauce (also used in BrE. AmE: ketchup); zucchini (shared with AmE. BrE: courgette)

Transport – aeroplane (shared with BrE. AmE: airplane); bonnet (shared with BrE. AmE: hood); bumper (shared with BrE. AmE: fender); car park (shared with BrE. AmE: parking lot); convertible (shared with AmE. BrE: cabriolet); footpath (BrE: pavement; AmE: sidewalk); horse float (BrE: horsebox; AmE: horse trailer); indicator (shared with BrE. AmE: turn signal); peak hour (BrE and AmE: rush hour); petrol (shared with BrE. AmE: gasoline); railway (shared with BrE. AmE: railroad); sedan (car) (shared with AmE. BrE: saloon (car)); semitrailer (shared with AmE. BrE: artic or articulated lorry); station wagon (shared with AmE. BrE: estate car); truck (shared with AmE. BrE: lorry); ute (BrE and AmE: pickup truck); windscreen (shared with BrE. AmE: windshield) 

Clothing – gumboots (BrE: Wellington boots or Wellies; AmE: rubber boots or galoshes); jumper (shared with BrE. AmE: sweater); nappy (shared with BrE. AmE: diaper); overalls (shared with AmE. BrE: dungarees); raincoat (shared with AmE. BrE: mackintosh or mac); runners (footwear) (BrE: trainers. AmE: sneakers); sandshoe (BrE: pump or plimsoll. AmE: tennis shoe); singlet (BrE: vest. AmE: tank top or wifebeater); skivvy (BrE: polo neck; AmE: turtleneck); swimmers or togs or bathers (BrE: swimming costume. AmE: bathing suit or swimsuit); thongs (refers to BrE and AmE flip-flops (footwear). In BrE and AmE refers to g-string (underwear))

Terms with different meanings in Australian English
There also exist words which in Australian English are ascribed different meanings from those ascribed in other varieties of English, for instance:
 Asian in Australian (and American) English commonly refers to people of East Asian ancestry, while in British English it commonly refers to people of South Asian ancestry
 Biscuit in Australian (and British) English refers to AmE cookie and cracker, while in American English it refers to a leavened bread product
 (potato) Chips refers both to British English crisps (which is not commonly used in Australian English) and to American English French fries (which is used alongside hot chips)
 Football in Australian English most commonly refers to Australian rules football, rugby league or rugby union. In British English, football is most commonly used to refer to association football, while in North American English football is used to refer to gridiron
 Pants in Australian (and American) English most commonly refers to British English trousers, but in British English refers to Australian English underpants
 Nursery in Australian English generally refers to a plant nursery, whereas in British English and American English it also often refers to a child care or daycare for pre-school age children
 Paddock in Australian English refers to an open field or meadow whereas in American and British English it refers to a small agricultural enclosure
 Premier in Australian English refers specifically to the head of government of an Australian state, whereas in British English it is used interchangeably with Prime Minister
 Public school in Australian (and American) English refers to a state school. Australian and American English use private school to mean a non-government or independent school, in contrast with British English which uses public school to refer to the same thing
 Pudding in Australian (and American) English refers to a particular sweet dessert dish, while in British English it often refers to dessert (the food course) in general
 Thongs in Australian English refer to British and American English flip-flop (footwear), whereas in both American and British English it refers to Australian English G-string (underwear) (in Australian English the singular "thong" can refer to one half of a pair of the footwear or to a G-string, so care must be taken as to context)
 Vest in Australian (and American) English refers to a padded upper garment or British English waistcoat but in British English refers to Australian English singlet

Idioms taking different forms in Australian English
In addition to the large number of uniquely Australian idioms in common use, there are instances of idioms taking different forms in Australian English than in other varieties, for instance:
 A drop in the ocean (shared with BrE usage) as opposed to AmE a drop in the bucket
 A way to go (shared with BrE usage) as opposed to AmE a ways to go
 Home away from home (shared with AmE usage) as opposed to BrE home from home
 Take (something) with a grain of salt (shared with AmE usage) as opposed to UK take with a pinch of salt
 Touch wood (shared with BrE usage) as opposed to AmE knock on wood
 Wouldn't touch (something) with a ten-foot pole (shared with AmE usage) as opposed to BrE wouldn't touch with a barge pole

British and American English terms not commonly used in Australian English
There are extensive terms used in other varieties of English which are not widely used in Australian English. These terms usually do not result in Australian English speakers failing to comprehend speakers of other varieties of English, as Australian English speakers will often be familiar with such terms through exposure to media or may ascertain the meaning using context.

Non-exhaustive selections of British English and American English terms not commonly used in Australian English together with their definitions or Australian English equivalents are found in the collapsible table below:

Grammar
The general rules of English Grammar which apply to Australian English are described at English grammar. Grammatical differences between varieties of English are minor relative to differences in phonology and vocabulary and do not generally affect intelligibility. Examples of grammatical differences between Australian English and other varieties include:
Collective nouns are generally singular in construction, e.g., the government was unable to decide as opposed to the government were unable to decide or the group was leaving as opposed to the group were leaving. This is in common with American English.
Australian English has an extreme distaste for the modal verbs shall (in non-legal contexts), shan't and ought (in place of will, won't and should respectively), which are encountered in British English. However, shall is found in the Australian Constitution, Acts of Parliament, and other formal or legal documents such as contracts.
Using should with the same meaning as would, e.g. I should like to see you, encountered in British English, is almost never encountered in Australian English.
River follows the name of the river in question, e.g., Brisbane River, rather than the British convention of coming before the name, e.g., River Thames. This is also the case in North American and New Zealand English. In South Australian English however, the reverse applies when referring to the following three rivers: Murray, Darling and Torrens.  The Derwent in Tasmania also follows this convention.
While prepositions before days may be omitted in American English, i.e., She resigned Thursday, they are retained in Australian English: She resigned on Thursday. This is shared with British English. 
The institutional nouns hospital and university do not take the definite article: She's in hospital, He's at university. This is in contrast to American English where the is required: In the hospital, At the university.
On the weekend is used in favour of the British at the weekend which is not encountered in Australian English.
Ranges of dates use to, i.e., Monday to Friday, rather than Monday through Friday. This is shared with British English and is in contrast to American English.
When speaking or writing out numbers, and is always inserted before the tens, i.e., one hundred and sixty-two rather than one hundred sixty-two. This is in contrast to American English, where the insertion of and is acceptable but nonetheless either casual or informal.
The preposition to in write to (e.g. "I'll write to you") is always retained, as opposed to American usage where it may be dropped. 
Australian English does not share the British usage of read (v) to mean "study" (v). Therefore, it may be said that "He studies medicine" but not that "He reads medicine".
When referring to time, Australians will refer to 10:30 as half past ten and do not use the British half ten. Similarly, a quarter to ten is used for 9:45 rather than (a) quarter of ten, which is sometimes found in American English.
Australian English does not share the British English meaning of sat to include sitting or seated. Therefore, uses such as I've been sat here for an hour are not encountered in Australian English.
To have a shower or have a bath are the most common usages in Australian English, in contrast to American English which uses take a shower and take a bath.
The past participle of saw is sawn (e.g. sawn-off shotgun) in Australian English, in contrast to the American English sawed.
The verb visit is transitive in Australian English. Where the object is a person or people, American English also uses visit with, which is not found in Australian English.
An outdoor event which is cancelled due to inclement weather is rained out in Australian English. This is in contrast to British English where it is said to be rained off.
In informal speech, sentence-final but may be used, e.g. "I don't want to go but" in place of "But I don't want to go". This is also found in Scottish English.
In informal speech, the discourse markers yeah no (or yeah nah) and no yeah (or nah yeah) may be used to mean "no" and "yes" respectively.

Spelling and style
As in all English-speaking countries, there is no central authority that prescribes official usage with respect to matters of spelling, grammar, punctuation or style.

Spelling
 

There are several dictionaries of Australian English which adopt a descriptive approach. The Macquarie Dictionary is most commonly used by universities, governments and courts as the standard for Australian English spelling. The Australian Oxford Dictionary is another commonly-used dictionary of Australian English.

Australian spelling is significantly closer to British than American spelling, as it did not adopt the systematic reforms promulgated in Noah Webster's 1828 Dictionary. Notwithstanding, the Macquarie Dictionary often lists most American spellings as acceptable secondary variants.

The minor systematic differences which occur between Australian and American spelling are summarised below:
 French-derived words which in American English end with or, such as color, honor, behavior and labor, are spelt with our in Australian English: colour, honour, behaviour and labour. Exceptions are the Australian Labor Party and some (especially South Australian) placenames which use Harbor, notably Victor Harbor.
 Words which in American English end with ize, such as realize, recognize and apologize are spelt with ise in Australian English: realise, recognise and apologise. The British Oxford spelling, which uses the ize endings, remains a minority variant. The Macquarie Dictionary says that the -ise form as opposed to -ize sits at 3:1. The sole exception to this is capsize, which is used in all varieties.
 Words which in American English end with yze, such as analyze, paralyze and catalyze are spelt with yse in Australian English: analyse, paralyse and catalyse.
 French-derived words which in American English end with er, such as fiber, center and meter are spelt with re in Australian English: fibre, centre and metre (the unit of measurement only, not physical devices; so gasometer, voltmeter).
 Words which end in American English end with log, such as catalog, dialog and monolog are usually spelt with logue in Australian English: catalogue, dialogue and monologue, however the Macquarie Dictionary lists the log spelling as the preferred variant for analog.
 A double-consonant l is retained in Australian English when adding suffixes to words ending in l where the consonant is unstressed, contrary to American English. Therefore, Australian English favours cancelled, counsellor, and travelling over American canceled, counselor and traveling.
 Where American English uses a double-consonant ll in the words skillful, willful, enroll, distill, enthrall, fulfill and installment, Australian English uses a single consonant: skilful, wilful, enrol, distil, enthral, fulfil and instalment. However, the Macquarie Dictionary has noted a growing tendency to use the double consonant.
 The American English defense and offense are spelt defence and offence in Australian English.
 In contrast with American English, which uses practice and license for both nouns and verbs, practice and licence are nouns while practise and license are verbs in Australian English.
 Words with ae and oe are often maintained in words such as oestrogen and paedophilia, in contrast to the American English practice of using e alone (as in estrogen and pedophilia). The Macquarie Dictionary has noted a shift within Australian English towards using e alone, and now lists some words such as encyclopedia, fetus, eon or hematite with the e spelling as the preferred variant and hence Australian English varies by word when it comes to these sets of words.

Minor systematic difference which occur between Australian and British spelling are as follows:
 Words often ending in eable in British English end in able in Australian English. Therefore, Australian English favours livable over liveable, sizable over sizeable, movable over moveable, etc., although both variants are acceptable.
 Words often ending in eing in British English end in ing in Australian English. Therefore, Australian English favours aging over ageing, or routing over routeing, etc., although both variants are acceptable.
 Words often ending in mme in British English end in m in Australian English. Therefore, Australian English favours program over programme (in all contexts) and aerogram over aerogramme, although both variants are acceptable. Similar to Canada, New Zealand and the United States, (kilo)gram is the only spelling.

Other examples of individual words where the preferred spelling is listed by the Macquarie Dictionary as being different from current British spellings include analog as opposed to analogue, guerilla as opposed to guerrilla, verandah as opposed to veranda, burqa as opposed to burka, pastie (noun) as opposed to pasty, neuron as opposed to neurone, hicup as opposed to hicough, annex as opposed to annexe, raccoon as opposed to racoon etc. Unspaced forms such as onto, anytime, alright and anymore are also listed as being equally as acceptable as their spaced counterparts.

There is variation between and within varieties of English in the treatment of -t and -ed endings for past tense verbs. The Macquarie Dictionary does not favour either, but it suggests that leaped, leaned or  learned (with -ed endings) are more common but spelt and burnt (with -t endings) are more common.

Different spellings have existed throughout Australia's history. What are today regarded as American spellings were popular in Australia throughout the late 19th and early 20th centuries, with the Victorian Department of Education endorsing them into the 1970s and The Age newspaper until the 1990s. This influence can be seen in the spelling of the Australian Labor Party and also in some place names such as Victor Harbor. The Concise Oxford English Dictionary has been attributed with re-establishing the dominance of the British spellings in the 1920s and 1930s. For a short time during the late 20th century, Harry Lindgren's 1969 spelling reform proposal (Spelling Reform 1 or SR1) gained some support in Australia and was adopted by the Australian Teachers' Federation.

Punctuation and style
Prominent general style guides for Australian English include the Cambridge Guide to Australian English Usage, the Australian Government Style Manual (formerly the Style Manual: For Authors, Editors and Printers), the Australian Handbook for Writers and Editors and the Complete Guide to English Usage for Australian Students.

Both single and double quotation marks are in use, with single quotation marks preferred for use in the first instance, with double quotation marks reserved for quotes of speech within speech. Logical (as opposed to typesetter's) punctuation is preferred for punctuation marks at the end of quotations. For instance, Sam said he 'wasn't happy when Jane told David to "go away"'. is used in preference to Sam said he "wasn't happy when Jane told David to 'go away.'"

The DD/MM/YYYY date format is followed and the 12-hour clock is generally used in everyday life (as opposed to service, police, and airline applications).

With the exception of screen sizes, metric  units are used in everyday life, having supplanted imperial units upon the country's switch to the metric system in the 1970s, although imperial units persist in casual references to a person's height. Tyre and bolt sizes (for example) are defined in imperial units where appropriate for technical reasons.

In betting, decimal odds are used in preference to fractional odds, as used in the United Kingdom, or moneyline odds in the United States.

Keyboard layout
There are two major English language keyboard layouts, the United States layout and the United Kingdom layout. Keyboards and keyboard software for the Australian market universally uses the US keyboard layout, which lacks the pound (£), euro and negation symbols and uses a different layout for punctuation symbols from the UK keyboard layout.

See also

 The Australian National Dictionary
 Australian English vocabulary 
 New Zealand English 
 South African English 
 Zimbabwean English
 Falkland Islands English 
 Diminutives in Australian English
 International Phonetic Alphabet chart for English dialects
 Strine

References

Citations

Works cited

Further reading

 
 Mitchell, Alexander G. (1995). The Story of Australian English. Sydney: Dictionary Research Centre.

External links

 Aussie English, The Illustrated Dictionary of Australian English
 Australian National Dictionary Centre
 free newsletter from the Australian National Dictionary Centre, which includes articles on Australian English
 Australian Word Map at the ABC—documents regionalisms
 R. Mannell, F. Cox and J. Harrington (2009), An Introduction to Phonetics and Phonology, Macquarie University
 Aussie English for beginners—the origins, meanings and a quiz to test your knowledge at the National Museum of Australia.

 
Languages attested from the 18th century
Dialects of English
Sociolinguistics
Languages of the Cocos (Keeling) Islands
Oceanian dialects of English
Languages of Australia